Leccinum arctoi is a species of bolete fungus in the family Boletaceae. Found in the Russian Far East, it was described as new to science in 1978.

See also
List of Leccinum species

References

Fungi described in 1978
Fungi of Asia
arctoi